The 1981 San Jose State Spartans football team represented San Jose State University during the 1981 NCAA Division I-A football season as a member of the Pacific Coast Athletic Association. Led by third-year head coach Jack Elway, they played home games at Spartan Stadium in San Jose, California.

The Spartans were champions of the PCAA, with a record of nine wins and three losses (9–3, 5–0 PCAA), and qualified for the initial California Bowl against the Mid-American Conference (MAC) champion Toledo Rockets. This was the second bowl appearance for the Spartans since moving up to Division I-A;  they were in the Pasadena Bowl a decade earlier. The California Bowl was played at Bulldog Stadium in Fresno, and Toledo won 27–25 with a late field goal.

In early December, offensive coordinator Dennis Erickson was hired as the head coach at Idaho in the Big Sky Conference, but coached the Spartans in the bowl game.

The Spartan offense was led by quarterback Steve Clarkson, running back Gerald Willhite, and wide receiver Tim Kearse.

Schedule

Team players in the NFL
The following were selected in the 1982 NFL Draft.

The following finished their college career in 1981, were not drafted, but played in the NFL.

Notes

References

San Jose State
San Jose State Spartans football seasons
Big West Conference football champion seasons
San Jose State Spartans football